Charef is a town and commune in Djelfa Province within Algeria. 

Charef may refer to:
 Boualem Charef is an Algerian football manager.
 Charef District is a district of Djelfa Province within Algeria.
 Mehdi Abid Charef is an Algerian association football referee.
 Mehdi Charef is a French film director and screenwriter of Algerian descent.
 Mohamed Charef is an Algerian theologian.